Jiske Snoeks (born 19 May 1978 in Haarlem, North Holland) is a Dutch field hockey player who plays as an attacker for Dutch club Amsterdam. She also plays for the Netherlands national team.

Snoeks was a member of the Dutch squad that won the silver medal at the 2004 Summer Olympics in Athens. She was also part of the Dutch squad that became world champions at the 2006 Women's Hockey World Cup and which won the 2007 Champions Trophy.

References
  Dutch Olympic Committee

External links
 

1978 births
Living people
Dutch female field hockey players
Field hockey players at the 2004 Summer Olympics
Medalists at the 2004 Summer Olympics
Olympic field hockey players of the Netherlands
Olympic medalists in field hockey
Olympic silver medalists for the Netherlands
Sportspeople from Haarlem
HC Bloemendaal players
20th-century Dutch women
20th-century Dutch people
21st-century Dutch women